Downie or Downey is a surname. There appears to be a number of sources of the Downie/Downey surname in Scotland and Ireland, with the intermittent mix in Ulster.  The spelling of the surname as Downie is almost unique to Scotland with minor instances in Northern Ireland (Antrim).  The following information on the origins of the name are taken from.

In Scotland
There are Dounie/Doune/Downie place names or hill forts or Dun in most parishes in Scotland, including Aberdeen, Angus, Stirling, Perth, Inverness and the Isle of Lewis.  The name may derive from any of these, or from the Barony of Downie in Angus.

It is also a derivative of the Gaelic Mac Gille/Maol Domhnaich or McAldonich  "son of the servant of the Lord (Sunday)" which both are anglicised to Macgildownie, Mcildownie and Gildownie (and many variations) to Downie, mainly in the parishes of Argyll, western Perth and Inverness.

In Ireland
O’Dunadhaigh is a person identified with a fort or Dun.  This surname is found mostly in County Galway, South West Cork and Leinster.  The surname is often anglicised to Downey.  Mac Dunadhaigh, identified with a fort or Dun, is the surname of an old Galway family.

Patronymics
The first name such as Maol Domhnaich, or Muldonich meaning the "Lord's Devotee" have been used in Scotland and may have been the precursors to the Mac variations.

Notable people

Notable people with the surname Downie include:

 Alex Downie, member of the Legislative Council of the Isle of Man
 Allan Watt Downie (1901–1988), Scottish microbiologist 
 Becky Downie (or Rebecca Downie), British gymnast European and world medalist
 Ellie Downie, British gymnast world and European medalist
 David Downie, American author 
 David L. Downie, American scholar
 Dorothy G. Downie (1894–1960), British botanist
 Freda Downie (1929-1993), English poet
 Gary Downie, production manager
 Gord Downie (1964–2017),  Canadian rock musician
 Jack Downie, Scottish footballer
 James Downie, 19th century footballer
 James Downie (cyclist), New Zealand racing cyclist
 Johnny Downie, Scottish footballer
 John Wallace Downie, Scottish businessman and politician
 Kenneth Downie, Scottish composer
 Leonard Downie Jr., American journalist
 Penny Downie, Australian actress
 Nick Downie, Soldier and war correspondent
 Robert Downie, Scottish soldier
 Robert Downie (footballer), Scottish football goalkeeper
 Steve Downie,  Canadian ice hockey player
 Tyrone Downie, member of Bob Marley and The Wailers

Places
 Downie Hills, Scotland
 Downiehills, Scotland
 Downie Peak, British Columbia
 Downie Point, Scotland
 Downie River, California
 Downie's Loup, a Scottish waterfall

Other
 Downie bodies
 Downie's spotted leaf beetle

See also 
 Downey (surname)

References